Psilocybe subacutipilea is a species of mushroom in the family Hymenogastraceae. Described as new to science in 1994, the species is found in Colombia. Based on its blue staining reaction to touch, the mushroom is presumed to contain the psychoactive compound psilocybin. P. subacutipilea is classified in the section Mexicana of the genus Psilocybe. It is similar to the Brazilian species P. acutipilea.

See also
List of psilocybin mushrooms
Psilocybin mushrooms

References

External links

subacutipilea
Entheogens
Psychoactive fungi
Psychedelic tryptamine carriers
Fungi of Colombia
Fungi described in 1994
Taxa named by Gastón Guzmán